Badiane may refer to:
 A synonym for the spice star anise
 A character in the animated film Sailor Moon Super S: The Movie
 Lhadji Badiane (b. 1987), French-Senegalese footballer
 Malick Badiane (b. 1984), Senegalese basketball player